The Quick and the Dead may refer to:

The quick and the dead (idiom), a phrase originating in the Bible and popularized by the Apostles' Creed

Films
The Quick and the Dead (1963 film), a war film directed by Robert Totten, set in Nazi-occupied Europe during World War II
The Quick and the Dead (1978 film), a documentary about Grand Prix racing, narrated by Stacy Keach
The Quick and the Dead (1987 film), a television movie directed by Robert Day, based on Louis L'Amour's 1973 novel
The Quick and the Dead (1995 film), a western directed by Sam Raimi, starring Sharon Stone as a female gunfighter

In print
 The Quick and the Dead (collection), a 1965 collection of stories by Vincent Starrett
 The Quick and the Dead (1943), a novel by Ellery Queen
The Quick and the Dead (1956), a book by Bill Waterton
 The Quick and the Dead (1973), a novel by Louis L'Amour
 The Quick and the Dead (1991), a book by George Grant
 The Quick and the Dead (2002), a novel by Joy Williams